St Mary's Church is in St Mary's Street, Preston, Lancashire, England. It is a redundant Anglican parish church, and was converted into a conservation centre in 2006. The church is recorded in the National Heritage List for England as a designated Grade II listed building.

History

St Mary's was built to accommodate the increasing population of the town in the early 19th century. Building began in May 1836 and the church opened in 1838.  The church was designed by John Latham, and was extended in a matching style with the addition of transepts and a chancel in 1852–56 by E. H. Shellard.  The church was declared redundant by the diocese of Blackburn on 1 March 1996, and was converted into a conservation centre for the Museum of Lancashire in 2006.

Architecture

The church is constructed in sandstone and has a slate roof. It is orientated in a north–south axis and is in Romanesque Revival style. The plan consists of a five-bay nave, east and west transepts, and a chancel. All the windows are round-headed. At the south end of the church is a tower flanked by wings. The tower is in four stages, the bottom stage being in three storeys. The lowest of these storeys contains a round-headed doorway with three orders of moulding. Both of the upper storeys contain a three-light window. Each of the three upper stages is set back, with two-light bell openings in the second and third stages. The top stage consists of a drum with corner cylinders, on which is a needle spire with lucarnes. The wings flanking the tower are of a similar height to its first stage. Both have round-headed doorways with a window above, and clasping pilasters, the outer one surmounted by squat pinnacles. The east and west sides of the wings are gabled. Along the sides of the nave the windows are set in round-headed arches, and the bays are divided by pilasters. The transepts also have clasping pilasters, and at the corners these rise to two-stage turrets containing blind arcading and topped by pyramidal caps. The chancel contains three lancet windows, with a circular window above.

External features

The gates, gate piers, and the walls surrounding the churchyard are also listed at Grade II. The walls and gate piers are in sandstone. The piers have a square plan, with panelled sides, and have plain caps with pyramidal tops. The walls form a boundary on the east and south sides of the churchyard, and incorporate twelve piers similar in style to the gate piers. The gates are ramped, their railings having spear heads. There are matching railings on a section of the wall, but the other railings were replaced in the 20th century.

Appraisal

The church was designated as a Grade II listed building on 27 September 1979, and the gates, gate piers and walls on 20 December 1991.  Grade II is the lowest of the three grades of listing and is applied to "buildings of national importance and special interest".  Hartwell and Pevsner in the Buildings of England series comment that the outline of the church "seems to owe a debt to the pinnacles at the west end of Tewkesbury Abbey" and that the massing of the architectural details is "reminiscent" of works by Christopher Wren and Nicholas Hawksmoor.

See also

Listed buildings in Preston, Lancashire

Notes and references
Notes

Citations

Sources

External links
Lancashire Conservation Studios website
Photograph on GENUKI

Grade II listed churches in Lancashire
Church of England church buildings in Lancashire
Romanesque Revival church buildings in England
Churches completed in 1856
19th-century Church of England church buildings
Former Church of England church buildings
St Mary's Church
Former churches in Lancashire